The Lodge in the Wilderness is a 1926 American silent Western film directed by Henry McCarty and starring Anita Stewart, Edmund Burns and Larry Steers. It is a Northern based on a 1909 short story of the same title by Canadian writer Gilbert Parker.

Cast
 Anita Stewart as Virginia Coulson
 Edmund Burns as Jim Wallace
 Larry Steers as John Hammond 
 Jim Farley as Bill Duncan 
 Victor Potel as Goofus
 Eddie Lyons as Buddy O'Brien
 Duane Thompson as Dot Marshall

References

Bibliography
 Connelly, Robert B. The Silents: Silent Feature Films, 1910-36, Volume 40, Issue 2. December Press, 1998.
 Munden, Kenneth White. The American Film Institute Catalog of Motion Pictures Produced in the United States, Part 1. University of California Press, 1997.

External links
 

1926 films
1926 Western (genre) films
1920s English-language films
American silent feature films
Silent American Western (genre) films
Films directed by Henry McCarty
American black-and-white films
Tiffany Pictures films
Films about lumberjacks
1920s American films